The 1945 Arkansas Razorbacks football team represented the University of Arkansas in the Southwest Conference (SWC) during the 1945 college football season. In their second and final year under head coach Glen Rose, the Razorbacks compiled a 3–7 record (1–5 against SWC opponents), finished in last place in the SWC, and were outscored by their opponents by a combined total of 222 to 112.

Running back John Hoffman led the team in both rushing and receiving in 1945. He totaled 587 rushing yards on 139 carries (4.2 yard per carry and caught 11 passes for 198 yards. Quarterback Bud Canada completed 24 of 69 passes for 272 yards.

Schedule

References

Arkansas
Arkansas Razorbacks football seasons
Arkansas Razorbacks football